Galveston County is a county in the U.S. state of Texas, located along the Gulf Coast adjacent to Galveston Bay. As of the 2020 census, its population was 350,682. The county was founded in 1838. The county seat is the City of Galveston, founded the following year, and located on Galveston Island. The most-populous municipality in the county is League City, a suburb of Houston at the northern end of the county, which surpassed Galveston in population during the early 2000s.

Galveston County is part of the nine-county Houston–The Woodlands–Sugar Land (Greater Houston) metropolitan statistical area.

History
Sixteenth-century Spanish explorers knew Galveston Island as the Isla de Malhado, the "Isle of Misfortune", or Isla de Culebras, the "Isle of Snakes". In 1519, an expedition led by Alonso Álvarez de Pineda actually sailed past Galveston Island while charting the route from the Florida peninsula to the Pánuco River. The information gathered from the expedition enabled the Spanish government to establish control over the entire Gulf Coast, including Galveston Island. In 1783, José Antonio de Evia, a Spanish navigator, surveyed the area and named the bay "Galveston" to honor Bernardo de Gálvez, who supported the United States in the Revolutionary War.

Galveston County was formally established under the Republic of Texas on May 15, 1838.  The county was formed from territory taken from Harrisburg, Liberty, and Brazoria Counties, with governmental organization taking place in 1839. The island and city of Galveston by far formed the most important population center. The city of Galveston was the republic's largest city and its center of commerce and culture. Port Bolivar on the Bolivar Peninsula was a port of secondary importance. Other development in the area was initially mostly ranching interests and small farming communities. Texas soon joined the United States, and Galveston's importance continued to grow as it came to dominate the worldwide cotton trade. As railroads between Galveston, Harrisburg, Houston, and other towns were built during the 19th century, small communities grew up along the rail lines. Nevertheless, Galveston continued to remain a prominent destination for the shipping and trade industries. A bridge was completed in 1859, when the Galveston, Houston, and Henderson Railroad built a wooden trestle that was used by all other railway lines to the island until 1875, when the Gulf, Colorado and Santa Fe Railway built its own bridge. At the end of the 19th century, a group of investors established Texas City directly across the West Bay from Galveston, with the hope of making it a competing port city. The port began operations just before the start of the 20th century.

The 1900 Galveston Hurricane devastated the county, killing an estimated 6000 people on the island alone and numerous others in the rest of the county. The Port of Galveston was closed for a time during reconstruction, but recovery was swift and profound. By 1910, the county's citizens had developed the commission form of government, constructed the seawall, and raised the merit of the whole city.

Investors had worried that the Texas coast was a dangerous place to establish major commercial operations because of the threat of hurricanes, and the 1900 disaster seemed to prove that. Though Galveston rebuilt its port and other major operations quickly, major investment moved inland, largely to Houston. Soon, Houston and Texas City had outpaced Galveston as major ports.

The oil boom in Texas began in 1901, and pipelines and refineries soon were built in Texas City. Industrial growth blossomed, especially during World War II. Galveston's manufacturing sector, however, was more stagnant during the 20th century.

Galveston, traditionally an attractive tourist destination even before the storm, transformed itself into a major, nationally known destination. Around this time, entrepreneur,  power broker, and racketeer Sam Maceo rose to power and transformed the island in what was known as the Free State of Galveston.  During this time, the city was home to many casinos, whorehouses, and speakeasies, in addition to becoming a center of culture, economy, and nightlife, all due to the free availability of gambling and alcohol.  The city's entertainment business spread throughout the county with major casino districts in Kemah and Dickinson enabled by a lax attitude among law enforcement in the county (Houstonians often humorously referred to the Galveston County line as the "Maceo-Dickinson line"). The county prospered as oil fueled Texas City's industrial growth, and wealthy tourists flocked to Galveston and the other entertainment districts. 

The gambling empire was destroyed in the 1950s, as state law enforcement dismantled its establishments. Galveston's economy crashed, as did the economies of some other county municipalities that were dependent on tourism. Texas City's economy weathered the storm because of its strong industry.

The establishment on NASA's Johnson Space Center in 1963 soon created new growth opportunities for the county municipalities near Clear Lake and Harris County. The Clear Lake area communities in Harris and Galveston Counties soon became more tied together, while the island of Galveston languished for many years as businesses increasingly left for the mainland.

Tourism has gradually resurged, both on the island and on the mainland, and today has become a major industry in the county. Aerospace and related service industries continue to be important in the Clear Lake area of the county. Texas City has become an important petrochemical center.

Geography

Galveston County is located on the plains of the Texas Gulf Coast in the southeastern part of the state. The county is bounded on the northeast by Galveston Bay and on the northwest by Clear Creek and Clear Lake. Much of the county covers Galveston Bay, and is bounded to the south by the Galveston Seawall and beaches on the Gulf of Mexico.

Adjacent counties
 Harris County (north)
 Chambers County (northeast)
 Gulf of Mexico (southeast)
 Brazoria County (west)

Communities
Galveston County has several unincorporated areas; most of them are on the Bolivar Peninsula. Others are outside of Hitchcock and Santa Fe along Texas State Highway 6, and the three communities in the "Bayshore" area: Bacliff, San Leon, and Bayview.

Cities 

 Bayou Vista
 Clear Lake Shores
 Dickinson
 Friendswood (small part in Harris County)
 Galveston (county seat)
 Hitchcock
 Jamaica Beach
 Kemah
 La Marque
 League City (small part in Harris County)
 Santa Fe
 Texas City

Villages
 Tiki Island

Census-designated places
 Bacliff
 Bolivar Peninsula
 San Leon

Unincorporated communities

 Algoa
 Bayview
 Caplen
 Crystal Beach
 Gilchrist
 High Island
 Port Bolivar

Alta Loma, previously unincorporated, became a part of Santa Fe in 1978.

Demographics

Note: the U.S. Census Bureau treats Hispanic/Latino as an ethnic category. This table excludes Latinos from the racial categories and assigns them to a separate category. Hispanics/Latinos can be of any race.

According to the census of 2000, 250,158 people, 94,782 households, and 66,157 families resided in the county. The population density was 628 people per square mile (242/km2). The 111,733 housing units averaged 280 per square mile (108/km2). The racial makeup of the county was 72.69% White, 15.44% Black or African American, 0.47% Native American, 2.10% Asian, 0.04% Pacific Islander, 7.18% from other races, and 2.08% from two or more races.  About 18% of the population was Hispanic or Latino of any race. By the publication of the 2020 census, the population grew to 350,682, with a racial and ethnic makeup at 54.57% non-Hispanic white, 12.30% non-Hispanic Black or African American, 0.30% non-Hispanic Native American, 3.48% non-Hispanic Asian, 0.06% non-Hispanic Pacific Islander, 0.41% non-Hispanic some other race, 3.61% non-Hispanic multiracial, and 25.28% Hispanic or Latino of any race.

Of the 94,782 households at the 2000 census, 33.80% had children under 18 living with them, 52.40% were married couples living together, 13.10% had a female householder with no husband present, and 30.20% were not families. Around 25.1% of all households were made up of individuals, and 8.1% had someone living alone who was 65 or older.  The average household size was 2.60, and the average family size was 3.12.

In the county, theage distribution was 26.7% under 18, 8.70% from 18 to 24, 30.2% from 25 to 44, 23.3% from 45 to 64, and 11.1% who were 65 or older.  The median age was 36 years. For every 100 females, there were 95.90 males.  For every 100 females 18 and over, there were 93.10 males.

In 2000, the median income for a household in the county was $42,419, and for a family was $51,435. Males had a median income of $41,406 versus $28,703 for females. The per capita income for the county was $21,568.  About 10.10% of families and 13.20% of the population were below the poverty line, including 17.60% of those under age 18 and 10.20% of those age 65 or over.

Politics

United States Congress

Texas Legislature

Texas Senate

Texas House of Representatives

Education
Eight independent school districts (ISDs) serve Galveston County communities:
 Clear Creek ISD
 Dickinson ISD
 Friendswood ISD
 Galveston ISD
 High Island ISD
 Hitchcock ISD
 Santa Fe ISD
 Texas City ISD
A ninth school district, La Marque Independent School District, was subsumed into Texas City ISD in 2016 after the Texas Education Agency revoked its accreditation due to poor academic and financial performance.

Higher education
The city of Galveston is home to Texas A&M University at Galveston, an extension of the main A&M campus in College Station, and the University of Texas Medical Branch at Galveston.

The Texas Legislature specified that the following community colleges also serve the area: College of the Mainland for Texas City (including former La Marque), Hitchcock, Santa Fe, Friendswood, and Dickinson school districts as well as the Galveston County portion of Clear Creek ISD (in other words, mainland Galveston County); and Galveston College for Galveston ISD and High Island ISD (the islands).

Public libraries
The Galveston County Library System operates libraries in most of the larger towns and cities.  The Rosenberg Library in Galveston has the distinction of being the oldest public library in Texas, and serves as the headquarters for the Galveston County Library System.  Its librarian also functions as the Galveston County librarian. Also, seven other libraries are in Galveston County,  including the Genevieve Miller Library in Hitchcock, the La Marque Public Library, the Helen Hall Public Library in League City, the Moore Memorial Public Library in Texas City, the Dickinson Public Library, the Friendswood Public Library, and the Mae Bruce Library in Santa Fe.

Political organization
The head of a Texas county, as set up in the Texas Constitution, is the county judge, who sits as the chair of the county's commissioners' court.  The county is split into four geographical divisions called precincts.  Each precinct elects a commissioner to sit as a representative of their precinct on the commissioners court and also for the oversight of county functions in their area.

Other elected positions in Galveston County include a county clerk, a district attorney, a district clerk, a county clerk, a sheriff, nine constables, a tax assessor-collector, a county treasurer, and every judge in the county except municipal judges, who are appointed by the officials of their respective cities.

Hospital services
Galveston County is served by a major medical complex in Galveston and a private for-profit hospital in Texas City.

The University of Texas Medical Branch in Galveston is a 1,200-bed, major medical complex of seven hospitals. The main general-care hospital is John Sealy Hospital, with other on-campus hospitals specializing in women, children, burn victims, geriatrics, and psychiatrics. Currently, UTMB is certified as a level I trauma center and serves as the lead trauma facility for the nine-county region in southeast Texas, including the Greater Houston area.

The Mainland Medical Center, a 233-bed, private, for-profit hospital, operates in Texas City.

Corrections
The Galveston County Jail is located at 5700 Avenue H in Galveston.

The Texas Department of Criminal Justice and University of Texas Medical Branch manage health care facilities for prisoners in Galveston, Galveston County. The facilities include the co-gender Galveston Hospital for prisoners in Galveston and the Young Medical Facility Complex for females in Texas City. Hospital Galveston began contracting for medical treatment of prisoners in 1983. Young opened in 1996 as the Texas City Regional Medical Unit.

Transportation

Major highways
  Interstate 45
  State Highway 3
  State Highway 6
  State Highway 87
  State Highway 96

  State Highway 124
  State Highway 146
  State Highway 275

Airports

Scholes International Airport at Galveston , the county's sole publicly owned airport, is a two-runway airport located on Galveston Island in Galveston. The airport is primarily used for general aviation, offshore energy transportation, and some limited military operations.

Privately owned airports for private use include Creasy Airport and Kami-Kazi Airport, both inn unincorporated areas.

The closest airport with regularly scheduled commercial service is William P. Hobby Airport, located in Houston. The Houston Airport System stated that Galveston County is also within the primary service area of George Bush Intercontinental Airport, an international airport near Houston in Harris County.

Private heliports for private use include:
 University of Texas Medical Branch in Galveston has two heliports: one for Ewing Hall and one for its emergency room.
 Republic Helicopters Heliport is in an unincorporated area, adjacent to Hitchcock.

Rail
All rail traffic is currently industry-related. Regularly scheduled passenger rail service in Galveston County ceased on April 11, 1967.

Mass transit
The City of Galveston is served by Island Transit, a public transportation agency.

Notable people
John Baptista Ashe, former U.S. Representative for Tennessee
 Dez Bryant,  American football wide receiver and return specialist for the Dallas Cowboys, was born in Galveston County.
 Red Bryant, American football defensive end for the Seattle Seahawks of the National Football League, was born in Galveston County.
 YBN Almighty Jay, rapper in the YBN collective, was born in Galveston County.
 Larry Taylor - Republican member of the Texas Senate from District 11 (2013-Present) and Texas House of Representatives from District 24 (2003-2013)

See also

 List of museums in the Texas Gulf Coast
 National Register of Historic Places listings in Galveston County, Texas
 Recorded Texas Historic Landmarks in Galveston County

References

Further reading
 Petitt, Jr., B.M. and A.G. Winslow. (1957). Geology and ground-water resources of Galveston County, Texas [U.S. Geological Survey Water-Supply Paper 1416]. Washington, D.C.: U.S. Government Printing Office.

External links
 
 Galveston County government’s website
 Galveston County Economic Development
 Historic materials of Galveston County, hosted by the Portal to Texas History
 Galveston Island State Park
 
 Galveston County District Court
 

 
1838 establishments in the Republic of Texas
Populated places established in 1838
Greater Houston